Sally Osborne (born 19 September 1952) is a British film and television actress. She has appeared in a number of television series including The Cedar Tree, Cribb, King's Royal, The Duchess of Duke Street, A Tale of Two Cities and Raffles.

Filmography
Film
 Mutiny on the Buses (1972)
 Sweeney! (1977)
 Haunted Honeymoon (1986)

References

External links

1952 births
British film actresses
British television actresses
Living people